G. Love & Special Sauce is an American rock band from Philadelphia. They are known for their unique, "sloppy", and "laid back" sound that encompasses blues, hip hop, rock and soul. The band features Garrett Dutton, better known as G. Love, Jeffrey Clemens on drums, and Jim Prescott on bass.

History 
The band formed in January 1993, when Dutton was performing at a Boston bar, The Tam O'Shanter. Here he met drummer Jeffrey Clemens. Dutton and Clemens began working as a duo, and were joined a few months later by bassist Jim Prescott, and became the house band at The Plough and Stars in Cambridge, Massachusetts. In 1994, they released their self-titled debut album on Okeh Records. On the strength of the single "Cold Beverage", due in part to the song's rotation on MTV, the album nearly went gold. Trying to capitalize on the success of the album, the group subsequently toured heavily, eventually landing a spot on the H.O.R.D.E. tour.

In 1995, they released their follow-up album Coast to Coast Motel. Although it did not sell as well as the first album, it is considered by many critics as the stronger of the two. On tour following the release of the second album, the group nearly broke up, due to disagreements about the group's finances. Deciding on a hiatus the three members went their separate ways, working on various side projects.

By October 1997, the group had reconciled their differences and released their third album, Yeah, It's That Easy, which along with their own work, showcased their collaboration with several other bands and musicians, including All Fellas Band, Philly Cartel, King's Court, and Dr. John. This soul-influenced album was more similar to their debut album than their previous release.

Soon after G. Love & Special Sauce set out on another world tour, returning to Philadelphia in 1999 for the release of their fourth album, Philadelphonic. Philadelphonic was followed up with Electric Mile in 2001, an album that shows the wide-ranging influences of the trio, incorporating hip-hop, funk, psychedelica, blues, and soul in equal and ambitious measure. Ever the road band, Mile was followed by extensive touring. During this time they performed as the house band for Comedy Central's show Turn Ben Stein On, which ran from 1999–2001.

In summer 2005, the band featured in an advertisement for the launch of Coca-Cola Zero, featuring the group's own unique version of the noted Coca-Cola advertising song "I'd Like to Teach the World to Sing". On June 24, 2008, Superhero Brother was released. On January 15, 2009, G. Love announced on the band's website that bassist Jimi "Jazz" Prescott is no longer a member of the band. On January 21, 2014, G. Love posted a release containing the announcement of the album Sugar, and stating that Jimi Prescott had returned to the band.  In 2014 Cadillac released a commercial featuring "Come Up Man".

Solo albums 
G. Love has released three solo albums. His first, The Hustle, was the first G. Love release under Jack Johnson's Brushfire Records banner. Johnson had been a guest on the Special Sauce album Philadelphonic. G. Love performed a series of shows in 2004 with Jack Johnson and fellow Brushfire Records artist Donavon Frankenreiter, and the trio also found time to issue a live EP. His solo albums include:
The Hustle (Brushfire Records – 2004) #100 US
Lemonade (Brushfire Records – 2006) #39 US
Fixin' to Die (Brushfire Records – 2011) #36 US

Musical style
The band's music encompasses blues, hip hop, alternative rock, blues rock, folk, funk, Philadelphia soul, psychedelic rock, rock and roll and soul.

Members

Current 
 Garrett Dutton as "G. Love" – vocals, guitar, harmonica (1993–present)
 Jeffrey Clemens as "Houseman" – drums, vocals (1993–present)
 Jim Prescott as "Jimi Jazz" – string bass (1993–2009, 2014–present)

Former 
 Mark Boyce – keyboards (2006–2011)
 Timo Shanko – string bass (2009–2013)

Tech credits 
 Randy Grosclaude – lighting designer for The Hustle tour

Timeline

Discography

Studio albums – with Special Sauce 
 G. Love and Special Sauce (Okeh – 1994) #32 Heatseekers
 Coast to Coast Motel (Okeh – 1995) #122 US #3 Heatseekers
 Yeah, It's That Easy (Okeh – 1997) #120 US #3 Heatseekers
 Philadelphonic (550 Music – 1999) #113 US #1 Heatseekers
 Electric Mile (550 Music – 2001) #138 US #4 Heatseekers
 Superhero Brother (Brushfire Records – 2008) #63 US
 Sugar (Brushfire Records – 2014) #49 US
 Love Saves the Day (Brushfire Records – October 30, 2015)
 The Juice (Philadelphonic Records – January 17, 2020)
 Philadelphia Mississippi (Philadelphonic Records – June 24, 2022)

Studio albums – solo 
 The Hustle (Brushfire Records – 2004) #100 US
 Lemonade (Brushfire Records – 2006) #39 US
 Fixin' to Die (Brushfire Records – 2011) #36 US

Bootlegs, demos or outtake albums 
 Back in the Day (1993)
 In the Kings Court (1996/1998)
 Oh Yeah (1998) [solo]
 G. Love Has Gone Country (1998)
 Rappin' Blues EP (1999)
 Front Porch Loungin''' (2000)
 Long Way Down (Philadelphonic Records – 2009)

 Compilation albums 
 The Best of G. Love and Special Sauce  (Sony – 2002)
 Playlist: The Very Best of G. Love & Special Sauce (The Okeh Years)  (Epic/Legacy – 2013)

 Live albums 
 A Year and a Night with G. Love and Special Sauce CD/DVD (2007)
 Live at Boulder Theater'' 2xLP Limited Edition(2019)

Singles

Music videos

References

External links 

 Philadelphonic.com
 G. Love & Special Sauce collection at the Internet Archive's live music archive
 Timo Shanko's website
 Cadillac ATS commercial featuring Come Up Man
 Garrett sits down with Ira Haberman of The Sound Podcast for a feature interview

American blues musical groups
American rock music groups
American soul musical groups
Brushfire Records artists
Hip hop groups from Philadelphia
Musical groups established in 1992
Musical groups from Pennsylvania
Musical groups from Philadelphia
Okeh Records artists